Prag may refer to:
 German, Swedish, Danish, Icelandic and Turkish for Prague
 Adi Prag (born 1957), Israeli Olympic swimmer
Derek Prag (1923–2010), British politician
Rameshbabu Praggnanandhaa (born 2005), Indian chess player
 Prague (2006 film), Danish film starring Mads Mikkelsen, Stine Stengade and Jana Plodková